The 2000 season of the ASFA Soccer League (now known as the FFAS Senior League) was the twentieth season of association football competition in American Samoa. PanSa Soccer Club shared the championship with Wild Wild West, each their first recorded title, with the winners of the 1998 league competition and a number of previous seasons unknown. PanSa East were able to claim joint first place by beating Konica FC 1–0 on the final day of the season.

Participating Clubs
 Konica Machine FC (Defending Champions)
 PanSa Soccer Club
 Panza West
 Leone Lions
 Renegades
 Utulei FC
 Nu'uuli FC
 Pago Pago FC

References

FFAS Senior League seasons
Amer
football